Dimitris P. Kraniotis (born 1966) is a contemporary Greek poet.

Biography
D. P. Kraniotis (b. 15 July 1966). was born in Larissa prefecture in central Greece and grew up in Stomio (Larissa). He studied at the Medical School of the Aristotle University in Thessaloniki (Greece). He lives and works as internal medicine specialist physician in Larissa (Greece). 

He is the author of 9 poetry books in 6 languages (Greek, English, French, Romanian, Albanian, Italian) and the Editor-in-chief of an international anthology in English (205 poets from 65 countries).

He has participated in several International Poetry Festivals. His poetry has been translated into 25 languages (English, French, Polish, Czech, Spanish, Turkish, Bulgarian, Romanian, Italian, Albanian, Arabic, Serbian, Dutch, Portuguese, Russian, Chinese, Japanese, German, Slovak, Macedonian, Persian, Bengali, Vietnamese, Gujarati, etc.) and published in many countries around the World.  

In 2011 the 22nd World Congress of Poets took place in Larissa, Greece. with D. P. Kraniotis as president. He also founded the 1st Mediterranean Poetry Festival in Larissa. He is member of several literary organizations (National Society of Greek Literary Writers, Hellenic Literary Society, Hellenic Society of Writing Physicians, World Poetry Movement, World Poets Society, United Poets Laureate International, Poetas del Mundo, etc.). Also he is the editor of the Greek poetry magazine "Poetics @ GR" (Τετράδιο Ποίησης)

Poetry
Ίχνη ("Traces") Larissa, Greece 1985 Greek
Πήλινα πρόσωπα ("Clay faces") Larissa, Greece 1992 Greek
Νοητή γραμμή ("Fictitious line") Emm. Lavdakis, Larissa, Greece 2005  Greek - English and French translation
Dunes-Dune ("Dunes") Orient Occident, Bucharest, Romania 2007  French and Romanian translation
Ενδόγραμμα ("Endogram") Malliaris Paedia, Thessaloniki, Greece 2010  Greek
Edda ("Edda") Orient Occident, Bucharest, Romania 2010  French and Romanian translation
Iluzione ("Illusions") Rawex Coms, Bucharest, Romania 2010,  Albanian translation
World Poetry 2011 (Anthology) United Poets Laureate International, Larissa, Greece 2011  English
Foglie vocali ("Leaves vowels") Pluriversum Edizioni, Ferrara, Italy 2017   Italian translation
Γραβάτα δημοσίας αιδούς ("Tie of public decency") Kedros, Athens, Greece 2018   Greek

References

External links

1966 births
Living people
Modern Greek poets
20th-century Greek poets
21st-century Greek poets